Elie Guillemer (2 February 1904 – 29 March 1987) was a French racing cyclist. He rode in the 1928 Tour de France.

References

1904 births
1987 deaths
French male cyclists
Place of birth missing